The 2021 Australian federal budget was the federal budget to fund government services and operations for the 2021–22 financial year. The budget was presented to the House of Representatives by Treasurer Josh Frydenberg on 11 May 2021. It was the eighth budget to be handed down by the Liberal/National Coalition since their election to government at the 2013 federal election, and the third budget to be handed down by Frydenberg and the Morrison Government. This budget was the second last to be handed down by the Morrison Government before their defeat at the 2022 Australian federal election.

Background 
This budget was handed down during the COVID-19 pandemic, and as such included further and ongoing measures for the recovery of the economy.

Expenditure

Debt and deficit 
Deficit

The Budget underlying cash deficit for 2021/22 is expected to be $106.6 billion, falling $52.7 billion from 2020/21.

Debt

The Australian government's debt level was forecast to be $963 billion in 2020/21.

See also 

 Australian government debt
 Economy of Australia
 Taxation in Australia

References

Australian budgets
2021 government budgets
Morrison Government
2021 in Australian politics